Serpin B9 is a protein that in humans is encoded by the SERPINB9 gene.
PI9 belongs to the large superfamily of serine proteinase inhibitors (serpins), which bind to and inactivate serine proteinases. These interactions are involved in many cellular processes, including coagulation, fibrinolysis, complement fixation, matrix remodeling, and apoptosis (Sprecher et al., 1995).[supplied by OMIM]

See also
 Serpin

References

Further reading

External links
 The MEROPS online database for peptidases and their inhibitors: I04.014
 

Serine protease inhibitors